Frank Riseley and Sydney Smith defeated Clement Cazalet and George Simond 6–2, 6–2, 5–7, 6–4 in the All Comers' Final, and then defeated the reigning champions Laurence Doherty and Reginald Doherty 6–8, 6–4, 5–7, 6–3, 6–3 in the challenge round to win the gentlemen's doubles tennis title at the 1906 Wimbledon Championships.

Draw

Challenge round

All comers' finals

Top half

Bottom half

References

External links

Men's Doubles
Wimbledon Championship by year – Men's doubles